The 2013 Louisiana–Lafayette Ragin' Cajuns softball team represented the University of Louisiana at Lafayette in the 2013 NCAA Division I softball season. The Ragin' Cajuns played their home games at Lamson Park and were led by thirteenth year head coach Michael Lotief and, for a short time while Lotief underwent family issues, former Cajun player Megan Granger served as interim head coach for the month of February.

Preseason

Sun Belt Conference Coaches Poll
The Sun Belt Conference Coaches Poll was released on February 4, 2013. Louisiana–Lafayette was picked to finish first in the Sun Belt Conference with 81 votes and 9 first place votes, all first place votes available.

Preseason All-Sun Belt team
Jordan Wallace (ULL, SO, Pitcher)
Hannah Campbell (USA, JR, Pitcher)
Sarah Draheim (ULL, SR, Catcher)
Matte Haack (ULL, SR, 1st Base)
Kayla Toney (MTSU, JR, 2nd Base)
Nerissa Myers (ULL, SR, Shortstop)
Natalie Fernandez (ULL, JR, 3rd Base)
Jessy Alfonso (FIU, SR, Outfield)
Brianna Cherry (ULL, SR, Outfield)
Blair Johnson (USA, SO, Outfield)
Kelsie Mattox (WKU, JR, Outfield)
Taylor Fawbush (FAU, SR, Utility/Designated Player)
Kayla Burri (FIU, SR, At-Large)
Brie Rojas (FIU, SR, At-Large)
Britney Campbell (USA, SR, At-Large)
Hannah Renn (TROY, SR, At-Large)
Karavin Dew (WKU, SR, At-Large)

Sun Belt Preseason Pitcher of the Year
Nerissa Myers (ULL)

Sun Belt Preseason Player of the Year
Jordan Wallace (ULL)

Roster

Coaching staff

Schedule and results

Baton Rouge Regional

Ann Arbor Super Regional

References

Louisiana
Louisiana Ragin' Cajuns softball seasons
Louisiana softball